is a Game Boy game based on the game show of the same name, broadcast on TV Tokyo. It includes support for the Super Game Boy, and was released only in Japan.

Gameplay

The entire game is in Japanese. Literacy is required to understand the rules and to properly play the game. Players have the ability to collect rice in a dish, collect food items to return to their goal post, or do even wackier stunts like pachinko under a strict time limit. All players must eventually win the "Gluttony Championship."

Despite popular opinion, there are no trivia questions to be answered in the game. The video game is intended for fans of the show who want to virtually appear on their television show without having to go through the audition process. These people are devoted fanatics of fast-paced physical stunt shows like the American television series Fear Factor. The player can choose between a male character or a female character. The object is to make it through three rounds of gameplay.

If the player can beat all three rounds, then he or she is considered to be the champion. A password system is used to continue any acquired progress through the game.

Reception
On release, Famicom Tsūshin scored the game a 15 out of 40.

References

External links
 TV Champion at SFC no Game Seiha Shimasho

1994 video games
Game Boy-only games
Japan-exclusive video games
Tom Create games
Video games based on game shows
Video games set in Japan
Yutaka games
Game Boy games
Video games developed in Japan
Sports video games
Single-player video games